Dan McCoy (born 1978) is an American comedian and was an Emmy-winning writer  for the news satire program The Daily Show.  He is the producer and co-host of the movie podcast The Flop House, which he co-hosts with comedian/bar owner Stuart Wellington and former Daily Show head writer Elliott Kalan.   He is the creator and co-star (along with Daily Show writer Matt Koff) of the animated webseries 9 AM Meeting, which won an MTV development deal at the 2010 New York Television Festival.

McCoy's father, Jerry McCoy, is a professor emeritus at Eureka College. Dan McCoy is a 1996 graduate of Eureka High School in Eureka, Illinois.  He is also a member of the Earlham College (Richmond, Indiana) Class of 2000.

Footnotes

External links 

The Flop House
9am Meeting

American male comedians
American podcasters
Living people
1978 births
People from Eureka, Illinois
Comedians from Illinois
21st-century American comedians